The 2022 Southern Intercollegiate Athletic Conference men's volleyball tournament, the inaugural men's volleyball SIAC tournament, was a men's volleyball tournament for the Southern Intercollegiate Athletic Conference during the 2022 NCAA Division I & II men's volleyball season. It was held April 19 through April 21, 2022 at Rock Hill Sport & Event Center. The winner was eligible for one of the two Wild Cards in the 2022 NCAA Volleyball Tournament, but they weren't selected. The conference champion won't get an automatic bid until the 2024 season. 

Central State went on to win the event, their first ever SIAC title in any sport.

Seeds
All 6 teams participated in the double elimination tournament. Seeds 1 and 2 received a 1st round bye. Seed 3 played Seed 6 and Seed 4 played Seed 5 in the conference tournament opening round. All matches were held at Rock Hill Sport & Event Center in Rock Hill, SC. The conference initially entered into a deal in 2019 for the women's volleyball and basketball tournaments to be held at the venue, with men's volleyball being added for this season. 

Seedings and placement are to be determined by win percentage. The SIAC has not posted what the tiebreaker procedures are.

Schedule and results

Bracket

Source:

All Tournament Team
Ray Lewis, Coach of the Tournament
Yaron Afek, Central State - Tournament MVP
Marcus Franck, Central State
Antonio Barazza, Central State
Evens Edouard, Edward Waters
Kenyon Haynes, Edward Waters
Ras Jesse Delancy, Benedict
Oshane Farquharson, Fort Valley State

References

2022 Southern Intercollegiate Athletic Conference men's volleyball season
Volleyball competitions in the United States